Sabato fascista ("Fascist Saturday") was established by the Italian Fascist Grand Council on 16 February 1935. Italians were expected to use Saturday afternoons engaged in cultural, sporting, paramilitary and political activities.

According to Tracy H. Koon, this scheme failed as most Italians preferred to spend Saturday as a day of rest. The Secretary of the National Fascist Party, Achille Starace, repeatedly complained about Italians' lack of participation.

Notes

Italian Fascism